Valmiera Parish is an administrative unit of Valmiera Municipality in the Vidzeme region of Latvia.

References 

Parishes of Latvia
Valmiera Municipality
Vidzeme